The Cincinnati Tradition Drum and Bugle Corps is an all-age drum and bugle corps based in Cincinnati, Ohio, United States. The corps is an active member of Drum Corps Associates (DCA), and two-time Class A champion.

The corps has maintained a presence in Tri-state area since its founding.

History 
The corps was founded by Tom Slade and Dan Hartwig in 1984. The corps acquired percussion and brass instruments from Silver Spectrum and Pride of Cincinnati Drum and Bugle Corps. Prior to 2009, the corps was not competitive, performing primarily as a parade corps and in exhibition at events within the Cincinnati metropolitan area. 

In 2010, the corps became an active member of DCA. The corps was a Class A finalist in 2014 and 2015, and class champions in 2016 and 2017. The corps advanced to Open Class in 2018, finishing the year in eighth place.

Show summary (1985–2022) 
Source:

Gold background indicates DCA Championship; Pale blue background indicates DCA Finalist.

References

External links 
 

Drum Corps Associates corps
Musical groups from Ohio
Musical groups from Cincinnati
Musical groups established in 1984